The Gran Canaria skink (Chalcides sexlineatus) is a species of skink in the family Scincidae which is endemic to Gran Canaria. Its natural habitats are temperate forests, temperate shrubland, Mediterranean-type shrubby vegetation, temperate grassland, rocky areas, sandy shores, pastureland, and plantations. The adults measure 16 – 18 cm out of which the tail forms 50%. Their legs are tiny, slim, and have five fingers. They live solitarily and only seek a partner during the mating season. They are ovoviviparous; females give birth to 2 - 4 babies after three months of pregnancy. They are kept as pets in vivariums.

References

 Brown, R. P. and R. S. Thorpe and M. Baez. 1991. Parallel within-island microevolution of lizards on neighbouring islands. Nature, 352(6330: p. 60-62.
 Brown, R. P. and R. S. Thorpe. 1991. Within‐island microgeographic variation in body dimensions and scalation of the skink Chalcides sexlineatus, with testing of causal hypotheses. Biological Journal of the Linnean Society 44.1 (1991): 47–64.
 Brown, R.P. and R. S. Thorpe. 1991. Within‐island microgeographic variation in the colour pattern of the skink, Chalcides sexlineatus: Pattern and cause. Journal of Evolutionary Biology, 4(4), pp. 557–574.
 Brown, R. P. and J. Pestano. 1998. Phylogeography of Canary Island skinks inferred from mtDNA sequences. Molecular Ecology 7: 1183–1191.
 Kubát, J. 
 Pestano, J. and R. P. Brown. 1999. Geographical structuring of  mtDNA in Chalcides sexlineatus within the island of Gran Canaria. Proceedings of the Royal Society (Lond.) B: Biological Sciences 266: 815–823.
 Suárez, N.M., J. Pestano, and R.P. Brown. 2014. Ecological divergence combined with ancient allopatry in lizard populations from a small volcanic island. Molecular Ecology, 23(19), 4799–4812.

Reptiles of the Canary Islands
Chalcides
Reptiles described in 1891
Taxa named by Franz Steindachner
Taxonomy articles created by Polbot
Fauna of Gran Canaria